The Microleve Corsario is a Brazilian amphibious ultralight flying boat that was designed and produced by Microleve of Rio de Janeiro. The aircraft was supplied as a kit for amateur construction.

The company appears to be out of business and the aircraft no longer available.

Design and development
The Corsario complies with the Fédération Aéronautique Internationale microlight rules. It features a strut-braced parasol wing, a two-seats-in-side-by-side configuration enclosed cockpit, retractable conventional landing gear and a single engine in pusher configuration. The landing gear is manually retracted.

The aircraft fuselage and hull are made from composites. The Mark 5 version of the Corsario offered two alternative wings. An all-composite wing of  span could be ordered with two  fuel tanks fitted behind the seats in the fuselage or an aluminum tubing and aircraft fabric wing of similar span was available with two  wing mounted fuel tanks. Standard engines available from the factory were the  Rotax 582 or  Rotax 618 two-strokes or the  Rotax 912UL four-stroke powerplant.

Specifications (Corsario Mark 5, tube and fabric wings)

References

External links
Microleve website archives on Archive.org

Carsario
1980s Brazilian ultralight aircraft
Homebuilt aircraft
Single-engined pusher aircraft
Parasol-wing aircraft